Hypolobocera is a genus of crabs in the family Pseudothelphusidae, found only in the San Juan River basin which drains into the Pacific, in Colombia. The major and future threats to this species include human-induced habitat loss/degradation and water pollution.

Species 
It containing the following species:

 Hypolobocera aequatorialis (Ortmann, 1897)
 Hypolobocera alata Campos, 1989
 Hypolobocera andagoensis (Pretzmann, 1965)
 Hypolobocera barbacensis Campos, Malgahães & Rodríguez, 2002
 Hypolobocera beieri Pretzmann, 1968
 Hypolobocera bouvieri
 Hypolobocera brevipenis Rodríguez & Diaz, 1980
 Hypolobocera buenaventurensis (Rathbun, 1905)
 Hypolobocera cajambrensis von Prahl, 1988
 Hypolobocera canaensis Pretzmann, 1968
 Hypolobocera caputii (Nobili, 1901)
 Hypolobocera chilensis (Lucas, in H. Milne Edwards & Lucas, 1844)
 Hypolobocera chocoensis Rodríguez, 1980
 Hypolobocera conradi (Rathbun, 1905)
 Hypolobocera dantae Rodríguez & Suárez, 2004
 Hypolobocera delsolari Pretzmann, 1978
 Hypolobocera dentata von Prahl, 1987
 Hypolobocera emberara Campos & Rodríguez, 1995
 Hypolobocera esmeraldensis Rodríguez & von Sternberg, 1998
 Hypolobocera exuca Pretzmann, 1977
 Hypolobocera gibberimana Pretzmann, 1968
 Hypolobocera gorgonensis von Prahl, 1983
 Hypolobocera gracilignatha Pretzmann, 1972
 Hypolobocera guayaquilensis Bott, 1967
 Hypolobocera hauserae Pretzmann, 1977
 Hypolobocera henrici
 Hypolobocera kamsara Campos & Rodríguez, 1995
 Hypolobocera konstanzae Rodríguez & von Sternberg, 1998
 Hypolobocera lamercedes Pretzmann, 1978
 Hypolobocera latipenis Pretzmann, 1968
 Hypolobocera lloroensis Campos, 1989
 Hypolobocera malaguena von Prahl, 1988
 Hypolobocera martelathani (Pretzmann, 1965)
 Hypolobocera meineli von Prahl, 1988
 Hypolobocera merenbergeriensis von Prahl & Giraldo, 1985
 Hypolobocera mindonensis Rodríguez & von Sternberg, 1998
 Hypolobocera muisnensis Rodríguez & von Sternberg, 1998
 Hypolobocera murindensis Campos, 2003
 Hypolobocera mutisi von Prahl, 1988
 Hypolobocera niceforoi Schmitt, 1969
 Hypolobocera noanamensis Rodríguez, Campos & López, 2002
 Hypolobocera orcesi Pretzmann, 1978
 Hypolobocera orientalis Pretzmann, 1968
 Hypolobocera peruviana (Rathbun, 1898)
 Hypolobocera plana
 Hypolobocera puyensis Pretzmann, 1978
 Hypolobocera quevedensis Rodríguez & Diaz, 1980
 Hypolobocera rathbunae Pretzmann, 1968
 Hypolobocera riveti Rodríguez, 1980
 Hypolobocera rotundilobata Rodríguez, 1994
 Hypolobocera smalleyi Pretzmann, 1968
 Hypolobocera solimani Ramos-Tafur, 2006
 Hypolobocera steindachneri Pretzmann, 1968
 Hypolobocera triangula Ramos-Tafur, 2006
 Hypolobocera ucayalensis Rodríguez & Suárez, 2004
 Hypolobocera velezi Campos, 2003

References

Pseudothelphusidae